Andy LeMaster is an American musician, songwriter, engineer, and producer from Athens, Georgia.  Now It's Overhead is the primary project for his own songwriting, while he also releases music under his own name and contributes as a co-writer on various projects.  LeMaster has engineered, produced, and performed on many albums since he began recording in the late 1990s, including releases by Bright Eyes, Now It's Overhead, Azure Ray, Conor Oberst, Maria Taylor, Orenda Fink, Better Oblivion Community Center, and Michael Stipe.  He is co-owner of Chase Park Transduction recording studio in Athens with fellow producer/engineer/musician, David Barbe.  He has been a frequent touring member of Bright Eyes since the late 90's, and has performed live as a band member with several other artists including Azure Ray, Fischerspooner, and Michael Stipe.  LeMaster is also a talented visual artist, and has done all the covers for Now It's Overhead's records.  Andy has stated in interviews that he identifies as gay.

Album Appearances
see also albums by Now It's Overhead

1998
Bright Eyes - Letting off the Happiness (1998) - Saddle Creek Records - Production, Engineering, Performance
Drive-By Truckers - Gangstabilly (1998) - Soul Dump Records/New West Records - Production, Engineering, Mixing
Macha - Self-titled (1998) - Jetset Records - Engineering, Mixing
Drip - Inside Job (1998) - Ghostmeat Records - Production, Engineering, Mixing, Performance, Writing

1999
Macha - See It Another Way (1999) - Jetset Records - Engineering, Mixing
Drive-By Truckers - Pizza Deliverance (1999) - Ghostmeat Records/New West Records - Mixing
David Dondero - Pity Party (1999) - Ghostmeat Records - Production, Engineering, Mixing, Performance

2000
Bright Eyes - Fevers and Mirrors (2000) - Saddle Creek Records - Engineering, Performance
Lona - To the Nth (2000) - Ghostmeat Records - Production, Engineering, Mixing, Performance

2001
Now It's Overhead - Self-titled (2001) - Saddle Creek Records - Production, Engineering, Mixing, Performance, Writing
Bright Eyes - Oh Holy Fools: The Music of Son, Ambulance and Bright Eyes (2001) - Saddle Creek Records - Performance
David Barbe - Comet of the Season (2001) - Backburner Records - Production, Assistant Engineering, Performance
Seaworthy - Ride (2001) - Jetset Records - Production, Engineering, Mixing, Performance

2002
Bright Eyes - Lifted or The Story is in the Soil, Keep Your Ear to the Ground (2002) - Saddle Creek Records - Engineering, String and Horn Arrangements, Performance
Bright Eyes - There Is No Beginning to the Story (2002) - Saddle Creek Records - Engineering, Horn Arrangements, Performance
Azure Ray - November EP (2002) - Saddle Creek Records - Production, Engineering, Mixing, Performance
R.E.M. - R.E.M.I.X. (2002) - Warner Bros. Records - Production, Mixing, Performance
Lovers - Starlit Sunken Ship (2002) - Orange Twin Records - Production, Engineering, Mixing, Performance
Mayday - Old Blood (2002) - Saddle Creek Records - Performance

2003
Azure Ray - Hold On Love (2003) - Saddle Creek Records - Production, Engineering, Mixing, Performance
Azure Ray - The Drinks We Drank Last Night (2003) - Saddle Creek Records - Production, Engineering, Mixing
Various Artists - Saddle Creek 50 (2003) - Saddle Creek Records - Production, Engineering, Mixing, Performance, Writing
Pacific UV - Self-titled (2003) - Warm Records - Production, Engineering, Mixing, Performance
The Few - Self-titled (2003) - PSB Records - Production, Engineering, Mixing, Performance

2004
Now It's Overhead - Fall Back Open (2004) - Saddle Creek Records - Production, Engineering, Mixing, Performance, Writing
Now It's Overhead - Wait In a Line (2004) - Saddle Creek Records - Production, Engineering, Mixing, Performance, Writing
Macha - Forget Tomorrow (2004) - Jetset Records - Engineering, Mixing
Azure Ray - New Resolution (2004) - Saddle Creek Records - Production, Engineering, Mixing
Bright Eyes - Take It Easy (Love Nothing)) (2004) - Saddle Creek Records - Engineering
Lovers - Gutter and the Garden (2004) - Orange Twin Records - Production, Engineering, Mixing, Performance
The Good Life - Lovers Need Lawyers (2004) - Saddle Creek Records - Mixing

2005
Bright Eyes - I'm Wide Awake, It's Morning (2005) · Saddle Creek Records - Performance
Bright Eyes - Digital Ash in a Digital Urn (2005) - Saddle Creek Records - Production, Engineering, Performance
Maria Taylor - 11:11 (2005) - Saddle Creek Records - Production, Engineering, Mixing, Performance
Orenda Fink - Invisible Ones (2005) - Saddle Creek Records - Production, Engineering, Mixing, Performance
Mayday - Bushido Karaoke (2005) - Saddle Creek Records - Mixing
Various Artists - Lagniappe:  A Saddle Creek Benefit for Hurricane Katrina (2005) - Saddle Creek Records - Production, Engineering, Mixing, Performance, Writing

2006
Now It's Overhead - Dark Light Daybreak (2006) - Saddle Creek Records - Production, Engineering, Mixing, Performance, Writing
Michael Stipe Featuring Chris Martin - In the Sun (Gulf Coast Relief) - EP (2006) - Warner Bros. Records - Engineering, Mixing
Bright Eyes - Noise Floor (Rarities 1998-2005 (2006) - Saddle Creek Records - Performance

2007
Maria Taylor - Lynn Teeter Flower (2007) - Saddle Creek Records - Production, Engineering, Mixing, Performance
Now It's Overhead - Dark Light Daybreak (Live in the Studio EP (2007) - Saddle Creek Records - Production, Engineering, Mixing, Performance, Writing
Bright Eyes - Four Winds (2007) - Saddle Creek Records - Performance
Bright Eyes - Cassadaga (2007) - Saddle Creek Records - Performance
Art In Manilla - Set the Woods On Fire (2007) - Saddle Creek Records - Mixing
Mezzanine Owls - Slingshot Echoes (2007) - Mezzanine Owls Records - Production, Engineering, Mixing, Performance
Summerbirds In the Cellar - With the Hands of the Hunter It All Becomes Dead (2007) - Slow January Records - Production, Engineering, Mixing, Performance

2008
Conor Oberst - Self-titled (2008) - Merge Records - Engineering, Mixing, Performance
Magnetic Morning - A.M. (2008) - Friend Or Faux Records - Engineering, Mixing
Rig 1 - Above the Tree Line West of the Periodic (2008) - Team Love Records - Production, Engineering, Mixing, Performance
The Fatales - Great Surround (2008) - Monopsone Records - Production, Engineering, Mixing
Mezzanine Owls - Snowglobe - 7 Inch (2008) - Jaxart Records - Production, Engineering, Mixing

2009
Conor Oberst and the Mystic Valley Band - Outer South (2009) - Merge Records - Engineering, Mixing, Performance
Orenda Fink - Ask the Night (2009) - Saddle Creek Records - Engineering, Mixing, Performance
Taylor Hollingsworth - Life With a Slow Ear (2009) - Team Love Records - Production, Engineering, Mixing, Performance
Maria Taylor - LadyLuck (2009) - Nettwerk Records - Production, Engineering, Mixing, Performance, Writing
Maria Taylor with Andy LeMaster - Savannah Drive (2009) - Nettwerk Records - Production, Engineering, Mixing, Performance, Writing
Har Mar Superstar - Dark Touches (2009) - Dilettante - Mixing
James Husband - A Parallax I (2009) - Polyvinyl Record Co. - Mixing

2010
Elf Power - Elf Power (2010) - Orange Twin Records - Engineering, Mastering
Azure Ray - Drawing Down the Moon (2010) - Saddle Creek Records - Performance, Additional Engineering
Various Artists - Broken Hearts & Dirty Windows:  Songs of John Prine (2010) - Oh Boy Records - Engineering, Mixing
Venice Is Sinking - Sand & Lines (2010) - One Percent Press Records - Engineering
New Idea Society - Somehow Disappearing (2010) - SHYE Records - Production, Engineering, Mixing, Performance

2011
Bright Eyes - The People's Key (2011) - Saddle Creek Records - Engineering, Performance
Drive-By Truckers - Ugly Buildings, Whores, and Politicians:  Greatest Hits 1998-2009 (2011) - New West Records - Production, Engineering, Mixing
Haroula Rose - These Open Roads (2011) - Production, Engineering, Mixing, Performance

2012
Conor Oberst - One of My Kind (2012) - Team Love Records - Engineering, Performance
Whispertown - Parallel (2012) - Acony Records - Production, Engineering, Mixing, Performance
Conduits - Self-titled (2012) - Team Love Records - Mixing
Azure Ray - As Above So Below (2012) - Saddle Creek Records - Production, Engineering, Mixing, Performance
White Violet - Hiding, Mingling (2012) - Normaltown Records - Production, Engineering, Mixing, Performance
The Casket Girls - Sleepwalking (2012) - Graveface Records - Mixing
Patterson Hood - Heat Lightning Rumbles in the Distance (2012) - ATO Records - Engineering

2013
Western Lows - Glacial (2013) - Jaxart Records - Production, Engineering, Mixing, Performance
Alessi's Ark - The Still Life (2013) - Bella Union - Production, Engineering, Mixing, Performance
Amanda Shires - Down Fell The Doves (2013) - Lightning Rod Records - Production, Engineering, Mixing, Performance
Pacific UV - After the Dream You Are Awake (2013) - Mazarine Records - Mixing, Writing
Lovers - A Friend in the World (2013) - Badman Recording Co. - Mixing
Maria Taylor - Something About Knowing (2013) - Saddle Creek Records - Mixing
Yip Deceiver - Medallius (2013) - New West Records - Mixing
Shonna Tucker and Eye Candy - A Tell All (2013) - Sweet Nectar Records - Mixing
Dead Confederate - In the Marrow (2013) - Spiderbomb Records - Engineering

2014
The Casket Girls - True Love Kills the Fairy Tale (2014) - Graveface Records - Engineering, Mixing
Conor Oberst - Upside Down Mountain (2014) - Nonesuch Records - Engineering, Performance
Michael Stipe - The Cold Lands Soundtrack (2014) - Production, Engineering, Mixing, Performance
Young Statues - The Flatlands Are Your Friend (2014) - Run for Cover Records - Production, Engineering, Performance

2015
Yip Deceiver - YPD E.P. (2015) - New West Records - Engineering, Mixing
Packway Handle Band / Jim White - Take It Like a Man (2015) - Yep Roc Records - Engineering, Performance
Reptar - Lurid Glow (2015) - Joyful Noise Recordings - Production, Engineering, Mixing
Des Ark - Everything Dies (2015) - Graveface Records - Mixing, Performance
Thayer Sarrano - Shaky (2015) - Guildwater Group - Production, Engineering, Mixing, Performance
Ruby the RabbitFoot & Yip Deceiver - Take a Bow/Crush - Single (2015) - Normaltown Records - Engineering, Mixing
The Casket Girls + Stardeath and White Dwarfs - What Keeps You Up At Night - EP (2015) - Graveface Records - Engineering, Mixing

2016
Ruby the RabbitFoot - Divorce Party (2016) - Normaltown Records - Production, Engineering, Performance, Mixing, Writing
Bright Eyes - The Studio Albums 2000-2011 (2016) - Saddle Creek Records - Engineering, Performance
Haroula Rose - Here the Blue River (2016) - Little Bliss Records - Production, Engineering, Performance
The Casket Girls - The Night Machines (2016) - Graveface Records - Engineering, Mixing
Maria Taylor - ‘’In the Next Life” (2016) - Flower Moon Records - Mixing

2017
Black Kids - Rookie (2017) - Production, Engineering, Mixing
Conor Oberst - Salutations (2017) - Nonesuch Records - Engineering, Mixing, Performance
Nana Grizol - Ursa Minor (Nana Grizol album) (2017) - Orange Twin Records - Production, Engineering, Mixing
Neighbor Lady - Maybe Later (2017) - Friendship Fever - Mixing
Sandy Devastation - ‘’BDMF” (2017) - Production, Mixing

2018
Glowworm - Can't Let Go (2018) - Post Dog Productions - Mixing
Fischerspooner - SIR (2018) - Ultra Records - Engineering, Mixing, Performance, Writing
Violet Delancey - Columbia Road (2018) - Production, Engineering, Mixing, Performance
Thayer Sarrano - I Will Never Be Used To Your Beauty (2018) - Guildwater Group - Production, Engineering, Mixing, Performance
Michael Stipe - Souris Calle - Souris Nocturne (2018) - Perrotin - Production, Engineering, Mixing, Performance, Writing
Azure Ray - Waves (2018) - Flower Moon Records - Mixing
The Glands - Double Coda (2018) - New West Records - Engineering, Mixing
Sandy Devastation - Total Brooklyn Bitch (2018) - Production, Mixing

2019
Better Oblivion Community Center - 'Self-titled (2019) - Dead Oceans - Production, Engineering, Performance
LeeAnn Peppers - ‘’For Asha, With Hope” (2019) - Mixing
Maria Taylor - Self-titled (2019) - Flower Moon Records - Mixing
Sailors & Ships - Self-titled (2019) - Laser Brains - Mixing
Polyenso - Year of the Dog - (2019) - Other People Records - Production, Engineering, Mixing, Performance
Michael Stipe - Your Capricious Soul (2019) - Futurepicenter, Inc - Production, Engineering, Mixing, Performance, Writing

2020
Bright Eyes - Down in the Weeds, Where the World Once Was (2020) - Dead Oceans - Performance
Michael Stipe, Big Red Machine - No Time For Love Like Now (2020) - Engineering
Michael Stipe - Drive to the Ocean (2020) - Futurepicenter, Inc - Production, Engineering, Mixing, Performance, Writing
Polyenso - Red Colored Pencil - (2020) - Dog Radio - Engineering, Mixing
Polyenso - Dust Devil - (2020) - Dog Radio - Production, Engineering, Mixing
Polyenso - Lost in the Wheel / MissU - (2020) - Dog Radio - Engineering, Mixing

2021
Timothy Ivan - Grayhair (2021) - Forasister Records - Production, Engineering, Mixing, Performance
Polyenso - Pocket Knife Shadow - (2021) - Dog Radio - Engineering, Mixing
Sunset Honor Unit - Self-titled EP - (2021) - Mixing
Jason Isbell and the 400 Unit - ‘’Reverse‘’ - ‘’Georgia Blue‘’ - (2021) - Southeastern Records - Writing
Michael Stipe - Sunday Morning - “I'll Be Your Mirror:  A Tribute to The Velvet Underground & Nico” - (2021) - UMG Recordings, Inc. - Production, Engineering, Mixing, Performance
Andy LeMaster - Joe Bell (Original Motion Picture Soundtrack) - (2021) - Lakeshore Records - Production, Engineering, Mixing, Performance, Writing

2022
Night Palace - Diving Rings (2022) - Park the Van Records - Engineering
Sandy Devastation - Polesmoker (2022) - Production, Mixing
Georgia Marshall - Look At Me Now (2022) - Production, Engineering, Mixing, Performance, Writing
Ruby the RabbitFoot - Like Doves and Roses (2022) - Aerobic International - Production, Engineering, Performance, Mixing, Writing
Mykki Blanco, Michael Stipe - Family Ties - Stay Close To Music (2022) - Engineering
Michael Stipe with Brian Eno - Future, If Future - Limited Edition Bioplastic 12 inch - (2022) - Earth Percent - Production, Engineering, Mixing, Performance, Writing

References

External links
Saddle Creek Records
Chase Park Transduction Studio
Official Now It's Overhead Website
Wonderful Scar live video

Living people
Year of birth missing (living people)
American male singer-songwriters
American multi-instrumentalists
Musicians from Athens, Georgia
Saddle Creek Records artists
Writers from Athens, Georgia
Singer-songwriters from Georgia (U.S. state)